Phamong is a community council located in the Mohale's Hoek District of Lesotho. Its population in 2006 was 8,402.  Chieftainess Nthati Bereng Bereng was confirmed into office as Principal Chief of Phamong at a ceremony presided over by King Letsie III on August 27, 2004. The inauguration follows the death of her husband in 2002.

Villages
The community of Phamong includes the villages of Fika-Khomo, Ha K'hobo, Ha Kheleli, Ha Lehloenya, Ha Lempe, Ha Lempe (Lithabaneng), Ha Lethena, Ha Lipakela, Ha Makara, Ha Makausi, Ha Makhafola, Ha Malephane, Ha Meso, Ha Mk'hono, Ha Mokoto, Ha Mpompo, Ha Ntloana, Ha Ntoi, Ha Phalana, Ha Phokoana, Ha Putsoana, Ha Qacha, Ha Qiqita, Ha Qiqita (Hloahloeng), Ha Qiqita (Mohlakeng), Ha Rachabana, Ha Rajoalane, Ha Ralekhaola, Ha Ramabutsoela, Ha Ratsoane, Ha Seteke, Ha Taba-li-atile, Ha Tankele (Mafoseng), Ha Tankele (Maqalikeng), Ha Tapisi, Ha Teboho, Ha Teboho (Ha Makhofola), Ha Tlhong, Hekeng (Ha Makhabane), Khubetsoana, Koti-se-phola, Liboti, Likhohloaneng, Likotolaneng, Lipeleng, Matsetseng, Methalaneng, Mothating, Motse-Mocha, Phamong (Aupolasi), Phamong (Makaung), Phamong (Motse-Mocha), Phatlalla, Phiring (Ha Mphole), Phiring (Matoporong), Phiring (Moreneng), Phiring (Motse-Mocha), Phiring (Mpobong), Sealuma, Seforong, Sekoting, Sepotong, Thepung, Thoteng, Tlhakoaneng and Tšepong.

References

External links
 Google map of community villages

Populated places in Mohale's Hoek District